Kennedy Summers (born March 3, 1987) is a German-born American model, actress and stock trader. She was Playboy Playmate of the Year in 2014.

Early life 
Summers was born in Berlin, to a military family, and raised in Hampton, Virginia. Her father served in the United States Army and her mother was a Russian linguist and cryptographer. Summers is also multilingual.

Career 
Summers began modeling at age 14. She retired after Playboy.

For stock trading, Summers works from 5:30-8:00 AM as a day trader, which she began doing after being approached by Equities.com.

Personal life 
Summers graduated from Mary Baldwin College with a degree in anthropology. She holds a Master of Healthcare Administration degree, and went to medical school in Curaçao to become a doctor. She graduated with a medical degree (M.D.) in 2020.

Filmography

References 

Living people
1987 births
American female models
Playboy Playmates of the Year
American stock traders
Mary Baldwin University alumni
People from Hampton, Virginia
21st-century American actresses
Women stock traders
People from Berlin
American people of German descent